Monica Niculescu was the defending champion, but she lost in the quarterfinals to Yanina Wickmayer.

Jelena Janković won the title, defeating Denisa Allertová in the final 6–2, 6–0.

Seeds

Draw

Finals

Top half

Bottom half

Qualifying

Seeds

Qualifiers

Qualifying draw

First qualifier

Second qualifier

Third qualifier

Fourth qualifier

Fifth qualifier

Sixth qualifier

References
Main Draw
Qualifying Draw

2015 Singles
Guangzhou International Women's Open Singles
Guangzhou International Women's Open Singles
2015 in Chinese tennis